Snurdy McGurdy and Her Dancin' Shoes is an album by American jazz saxophonist Roscoe Mitchell which was recorded in 1980 and released on Nessa. It was the debut of the Sound Ensemble which introduced four young musicians: trumpeter Hugh Ragin, guitarist A. Spencer Barefield, bassist Jaribu Shahid and drummer Tani Tabbal. The album was reissued on CD in 2003.

Reception

In his review for AllMusic, Brian Olewnick states that the album "belongs in the collection of any serious fan of late-20th century jazz" and claims that it's "surely Mitchell's most brilliant since his late-'60s masterpieces like Congliptious and Old/Quartet."

Track listing
All compositions by Roscoe Mitchell except as indicated
 "Sing/Song" – 7:48
 "CYP" – 7:12 
 "Stomp and the Far East Blues" – 5:15
 "March (Composition 40 Q)" (Anthony Braxton) – 4:41
 "Round" – 10:12
 "Snurdy McGurdy and Her Dancin' Shoes" – 5:21

Personnel
Roscoe Mitchell - soprano sax, alto sax, tenor sax, bass sax, clarinet, flute, wood flute
Hugh Ragin – trumpet, flugelhorn, piccolo trumpet
A. Spencer Barefield – guitar, 12 string guitar, electric guitar, piano
 Jaribu Shahid – bass, electric bass, cello, percussion
 Tani Tabbal – drums, percussion

References

1981 albums
Roscoe Mitchell albums
Nessa Records albums